"It's What You Value" is a song by English musician George Harrison, released on his 1976 album Thirty Three & 1/3. As a single release in the United Kingdom, in May 1977, it was issued in a generic sleeve.

The lyrics in the song are in reference to Harrison paying drummer Jim Keltner with a Mercedes 450 SL, in lieu of financial payment, for playing on his 1974 Dark Horse Tour.

Personnel
 George Harrison – vocals, electric guitar, cowbell, tambourine, backing vocals
 Tom Scott – saxophones
 Richard Tee – pianos
 Willie Weeks – bass
 Alvin Taylor – drums
 Emil Richards – marimba

References

George Harrison songs
Songs written by George Harrison
Song recordings produced by George Harrison
1976 songs
Music published by Oops Publishing and Ganga Publishing, B.V.
Dark Horse Records singles
1977 singles